The Prix Jeunesse 9–12 ans is awarded to comics authors at the Angoulême International Comics Festival. It rewards the best album for a 9 to 12 years old targeted public.
The award started in 1981 as the "Alfred enfant", without the distinction in age groups.
In 1984, the named changed for one year to "Alfred du meilleur album enfant".
From 1987, distinction is made between the age categories. This award is then called "Alfred moins de 12 ans".
In 1988, the name changes to "Alfred du meilleur album jeunesse".
In 1989, the name changes again to "Alph'art Jeunesse".
Between 1991 and 1995, the distinction between the two categories disappears.
In 1996, the name changes to "Alph'art Jeunesse 9–12 ans".

Award winners
the winner of the award for that year is listed first and the nominees are listed below.

1980s
 1981: Boule et Bill: Bill est maboul by Roba, Dupuis
 1982: Yakari: Le secret de Petit Tonnerre by Derib (artist) and Job (author), Casterman
 1983: L'étalon noir by Faure and Genin, Hachette
 1984: The Smurfs: Les Schtroumpfs Olympiques by Peyo, Dupuis
 1985: Trafic by Sternis and Cothias
 1986: Papyrus: La métamorphose d'Imhotep by De Gieter, Dupuis
 1987: Léonid Beaudragon: Le fantôme du Mandchou fou by Jean-Claude Forest and Savard, Bayard
 1988: Cori le moussaillon: l'expédition maudite by Bob de Moor, Casterman
 1989: Aquablue by Vatine and Cailleteau, Delcourt

1990s
 1990: Robin Dubois: Des oh et des bah! by Turk and De Groot, Le Lombard
 1991: Billy the Cat: Dans la peau d'un chat by Stephane Colman (artist) and Stephen Desberg (author), Dupuis
 1992: Le Petit Spirou by Tome and Janry, Dupuis
 Special mention: Valérian and Laureline: Les habitants du ciel by Pierre Christin and Jean-Claude Mézières
 1993: Prélude à l'apeupréhistoire by Widenlocher and Herlé, Dargaud
 1994: Donito: Le grand secret by Conrad, Dupuis
 1995: Mangecoeur: Dans le jeu des miroirs by Andreae and Gallie
 1996: Titeuf: C'est pô juste! by Zep
 (1997: no award in this category)
 (1998: no award in this category)
 (1999: no award in this category)

2000s
 2000: Lanfeust de Troy part 7 by Christophe Arleston and Didier Tarquin, Soleil
 Franky Snow: Slide à mort by Buche, Glénat
 Merlin: Contre le Père Noël by Joann Sfar and José-Luis Munuera, Dargaud
 Nathalie: Le nombril du monde by Sergio Salma, Casterman,
 Soda: Dieu seul le sait by Bruno Gazzotti and Tome, Dupuis
 2001: Les Profs: Interro surprise by Pica and Erroc, Bamboo
CRS = détresse:Coup, coup, c'est nous by Achdé (artist) and Raoul Cauvin (author), Dargaud
Gaspard de Besse by Béhem, Daric
Malika Secouss part 3 by Téhem, Glénat
Meurtre sous la manche part 1 by Sikorski (artist) and Denis Lapière (author), Dupuis
 2002: Trolls de Troy: Les maléfices de la thaumaturge by Christophe Arleston and Jean-Louis Mourier, Soleil
Kid Paddle: Waterminator by Midam, Dupuis
Malika Secouss: Groove ton chemin by Téhem, Glénat
Wake (Sillage): Le signe des démons by Jean-David Morvan and Philippe Buchet, Delcourt
Tendre banlieue: Appél au calme by Tito, Casterman
 2003: Zap collège part 1 by Téhem, Glénat
Les babyfoots part 1 by Pica and Bouchard
Franck Snow part 4 by Buche
Rob, Wed et Co part 3 by Janvier, Erroc and Jenfèvre
Titeuf part 9 by Zep
 2004: Luuna: Le crépuscule du lynx by Crisse & Nicolas Kéramidas, Soleil
Bételgeuse: Les cavernes by Léo, Dargaud
L'Héritage d'Emilie: Maeve by Florence Magnin, Dargaud
Les profs: Chute des cours by Pica & Erroc, Bamboo
Wake (Sillage): Artifices by Jean-David Morvan & Philippe Buchet, Delcourt
 2005: Lou!: Journal infime by Julien Neel, Glénat
Navis: Houyo by Philippe Buchet, José Luis Munuera and Jean-David Morvan, Delcourt
Les profs part 6 by Pica and Erroc, Bamboo
Le scorpion: Le démon du Vatican by Enrico Marini (artist) and Stephen Desberg (author), Dargaud
Tessa agent intergalactique: Sidéral killer by Mitric, Louis and Lamirand, Soleil
 2006: Wake (Sillage): Nature humaine by Jean-David Morvan and Philippe Buchet, Delcourt
L'enfant de l'orage: La croisée des vents by Didier Poli and Manuel Bichebois, Les Humanoïdes Associés
Kid Paddle: Darc, j'adore! by Midam, Dupuis
Les naufragés d'Ythag: Terra Incognita by Adrien Floch and Christophe Arleston, Soleil
Navis: Girodouss by Philippe Buchet, José Luis Munuera and Jean-David Morvan, Delcourt

2020s

References

Angoulême International Comics Festival
Children's literary awards